Emmanuelle 2: A World of Desire is a 1994 television movie from the Emmanuelle in Space series featuring several softcore sex scenes mostly between Krista Allen and co-star Paul Michael Robinson. It was directed by Jean-Jacques Lamore, produced by Alain Siritzky, and written by J.C. Knowlton, based on character by Emmanuelle Arsan. The cinematographic was by Andrea V. Rossotto.

Cast
 Krista Allen as Emmanuelle
 Paul Michael Robinson as Captain Haffron Williams
 P.S. Sono as The Abbot
 Kimberly Rowe as Angie
 Brad Nick'ell as Pierre
 Reginald Chevalier as Raymond
 Angela Cornell as Angela "Sexy Angela"
 Debra K. Beatty as Cara
 Holly Hollywood as Gee
 Lori Morrissey as Jay
 Steve Michaels as Dirk
 Tami Simsek as Madame Sylvia

External links

American television films
1994 television films
1994 films
Emmanuelle in Space
Films directed by Lev L. Spiro
1990s French films